Fashion Star Season 2 is the second and final season of the television show Fashion Star, appearing on NBC. The season began airing on March 8, 2013, with 13 designers competing to become "Fashion Star". The season is presented by Louise Roe who replaced Elle Macpherson. Celebrity mentors were Jessica Simpson, Nicole Richie, and John Varvatos. The buyers are Caprice Willard for Macy's, Terron Schaefer for Saks Fifth Avenue, and  Erika DeSalvatore for Express.

Unlike the first season, this season the mentors focused on four designers each.

Designers
Source:

Season progress

 Contestant sold to Macy's for the first time.
 Contestant sold to Saks for the first time.
 Contestant sold to Express for the first time.
 Contestant has sold to all three buyers.
Legend
 Lavender background means that the designer is part of team Nicole
 Brown background means that the designer is part of team Jessica
 Gray background means that the designer is part of team John
Results
 Blue background and ADV means that the designer made a sale and advanced to the final.
 Dark blue background and WINNER means that the designer advanced to the final and won the competition.
 Green background and SOLD means that the designer made a sale and was safe for the week.
 Plum background and 2ND RUNNER-UP means that the designer advanced to the final, but did not win the competition.
 Lime green background and RUNNER-UP means that the designer advanced to the final, but did not win the competition.
 Gold background and SAVED means that the designer was one of the bottom three/four designers for the week, but was saved by the mentors.
 Orange background and BTM 2/3 means that the designer was one of the bottom two/three designers for the week, but was not eliminated.
 Coral background and OUT means that the designer did not make a sale and was eliminated from the competition.
 Fuchsia background and BTM2 means that the designer made a sale, but was still put up for the bottom two.
 Red background and OUT means that the designer made a sale, but was eliminated.

Episodes

Episode 1: Showstoppers
Original Airdate: March 8, 2013

In their first challenge, the designers will be asked to design and create a must-have, one-of-a-kind show-stopping garment!

 Top sale: $200,000 (Hunter for Saks Fifth Avenue)
 Out: Bret Young

Episode 2: Sex Sells
Original Airdate: March 15, 2013

If there's one known in fashion, it's that sex sells, so this week, the designers are being challenged to create their sexiest piece.

 Top sale: $140,000 (Garrett & JesseRay for Macy's)
 Out: Tori Nichel

Episode 3: Something for Everyone
Original Airdate: March 22, 2013

This week's challenge: the mentors are helping their teams create pieces that fit every body type.

 Top sale: $110,000 (Cassandra for Express)
 Out: David Appel

Episode 4: It's Getting Hot in Here
Original Airdate: March 29, 2013

The designers must work in teams to create unique summer looks for the Macy's, Saks and Express buyers. Team John chose Tropical Paradise, Team Jessica chose Pool Party, and Team Nicole chose Summer in the City as their design themes.

 Top sale: $110,000 (Hunter for Macy's)
 Out: Priscilla Barroso

Episode 5: It Takes Two
Original Airdate: April 5, 2013

The remaining designers must work in pairs for the upcoming challenge to create one cohesive look from two separate garments despite style and personality clashes; the pair with the highest bid from the buyers are granted immunity from elimination.

 Top sale: $180,000 (Daniel for Saks)
 Top team: $355,000 (Daniel and Johana for Saks)
 Out: Brandon Scott

Episode 6: Buyer's Choice
Original Airdate: April 12, 2013

The buyers step in to work one-on-one with the remaining designers to help guide them in the process of preparing new pieces; after consultations with the buyers, some designers are left reeling and worried about what they're looking for.

 Top sale: $200,000 (Hunter for Macy's and Silvia for Saks)
 Out: Amber

Episode 7: Night Out on the Town
Original Airdate: April 19, 2013

The remaining designers must work together in pairs to direct their own photo shoot for a Fiat advertisement that showcases their latest piece; the participants must interpret what a 'big night on town' means and create a garment accordingly. Both people on the winning team will each receive a Fiat car.

 Top sale: $175,000 (Daniel for Express and Silvia for Express)
 Out: Johana
 Winner of Photo Challenge: Johana & Daniel

Episode 8: His and Hers
Original Airdate: April 26, 2013

The remaining designers are tasked with creating two unisex outfits that would work well on both male and female buyers that boast current fashion trends; after several end up in tears during a rough week, the sixth participant is sent home.

 Top sale: $200,000 (Garrett & JesseRay for Macy's)
 Out: Silvia

Episode 9: Trending Now-and-Then
Original Airdate: May 3, 2013

The final four designers are challenged with updating an old fashion trend reminiscent of years ago for the current spring/summer season, after which they get the chance to specifically choose a decade and create two new pieces for modern times.

 Top sale: $200,000 (Hunter for Saks and Hunter for Express)
 Out: Garrett & JesseRay

Episode 10: Finale
Original Airdate: May 10, 2013
The remaining three contestants are tasked with creating separate showcases consisting of three garments for each of the retailers. The designer that can meet the needs of Macy's, Express and Saks Fifth Avenue will be named America's new "Fashion Star" and receive a capsule collection in each of the stores.

Winner: Hunter Bell
Runners-up: Cassandra Hobbins and Daniel Silverstein

Ratings

References

2013 American television seasons